Rafael Alers (October 16, 1903 – March 20, 1978) was a musician, composer, bandleader and the first Puerto Rican to compose the music score for a Hollywood feature film.

Early years
Alers (birth name: Rafael Alers Gerena ) was born in the city of Aguadilla, Puerto Rico, to Don Ignacio Alers and Doña Anita Gerena. He received his primary and secondary education in his hometown.  The love that he developed for the Puerto Rican Danzas came about at a young age because of the influence which he received from his musically inclined family. He received his first musical instructions from the maestro Juan F. Acosta. With Acosta he learned to play the euphonium, a wind instrument which is essential in the execution of the danza.  He also learned to play the trombone and tuba.

Musical career

Upon finishing his musical instruction, Alers went to play for various national and international bands and Symphony Orchestras. Eventually, he formed his own band and recorded the Puerto Rican danzas composed by Juan Morel Campos, Manuel Gregorio Tavárez and Ángel Mislan.

In 1933, Alers was the conductor of Carmelo Díaz Soler's Orchestra, which had a daily segment in a radio program.  Alers took charge of the orchestra upon the death of Díaz Soler and in 1935 he felt the inspiration to compose a danza. He composed what was to become his greatest danza and named it "Violeta" and the following day he played it on the radio.

The public's acceptance and demand for the danza was so great that the radio station started a "Write the Lyrics to the Danza" contest. They were looking for the right lyrics to go with the musical melody of the danza. The lyrics written by Antonio Cruz Nieves, from the town of Cataño, was selected as the winner. Alers married Catalina Roldán and had four sons (the eldest now deceased) and three daughters. "Violeta", which was the title of his danza, was officially dedicated to his youngest daughter.

8 Danzones from Puerto Rico
One of the recordings by Rafael Alers was: 8 Danzones from Puerto Rico.	 	
"Conversación", 3:12	 	
"Delia y Belén", 3:03	 	
"El Torbellino", 3:08	 	
"Estrella de Borinquen", 3:16	 	
"La Borinqueña", 2:27	 	
"No me toques", 3:17	 	
"Recuerdos", 3:15	 	
"Sara", 2:38

Later years
Alers was named conductor of the ROTC band of the University of Puerto Rico, which in 1946 included a young man by the name of Julito Rodríguez, who was to become a professional musician himself.  Alers became the first Puerto Rican to compose the music score for a Hollywood movie when he was hired for such a task for the 1956 movie "Crowded Paradise", directed by Fred Pressburger. Many of his recordings were released in 1960, in a set of three volumes, titled "Rafael Alers: Danzas". Rafael Alers died on March 20, 1978 in San Juan, Puerto Rico.

His compositions have been recorded by many artists, including the singer Julita Ross.  In 2003, a collection of Rafael's recordings was released under the title: "Rafael Alers y su Orchestra, Danzas Vol.1".

See also
 
List of Puerto Ricans
 French immigration to Puerto Rico

Notes

References

1903 births
1978 deaths
Puerto Rican composers
Puerto Rican male composers
20th-century Puerto Rican musicians
People from Aguadilla, Puerto Rico
Puerto Rican people of French descent
20th-century American composers
20th-century American male musicians